The 1946 Oklahoma Collegiate Conference football season was the season of college football played by the six member schools of the Oklahoma Collegiate Conference (OCC) as part of the 1946 college football season.

The Southeastern Savages won the OCC championship with a 9–3 record (4–1 against conference opponents) and outscored opponents by a total of 193 to 92.

Conference overview

Teams

Southeastern

The 1946 Southeastern Savages football team represented Southeastern Oklahoma State College of Durant, Oklahoma. In their third, non-consecutive season under head coach Dave Stephens, the team compiled a 9–3 record, won the OCC championship, and outscored opponents by a total of 193 to 92.

Central State

The 1946 Central State Bronchos football team represented Central State University (now known as the University of Central Oklahoma) of Edmond, Oklahoma. In their third, non-consecutive season under head coach Dale E. Hamilton, the Bronchos compiled a 4–4–1 record (3–1–1 against OCC opponents), finished in second place in the OCC, and outscored opponents by a total of 121 to 72.

Southwestern Tech

The 1946 Southwestern Tech Bulldogs football team represented Southwestern Institute of Technology (now part of Southwestern Oklahoma State University) of Weatherford, Oklahoma. Led by fourth-year head coach Jake Spann, the team compiled a 5–3–1 record (2–2–1 against OCC opponents), finished in third place in the OCC, and outscored opponents by a total of 146 to 80.

East Central

The 1946 East Central Tigers football team represented East Central University of Ada, Oklahoma. In their first season under head coach Frank Crider, the Tigers compiled a 5–5–1 record (2–3 against OCC opponents), tied for fourth place in the OCC, and outscored opponents by a total of 150 to 119.

Northeastern State

The 1946 Northeastern State Redmen football team represented Northeastern State University of Tahlequah, Oklahoma. Led by third-year head coach D. M. "Doc" Wadley, the Redmen compiled a 4–5 record (2–3 against OCC opponents), tied for fourth place in the OCC, and were outscored by a total of 142 to 127.

It was Notheastern's first football team since 1942. Elmer Ary and Carlos Clayton, both of whom played for Northeastern prior to the war, were selected as the team's co-captains.

Northwestern State

The 1946 Northwestern State Rangers football team represented Northwestern State College (now known as Northwestern Oklahoma State University) of Alva, Oklahoma. Led by first-year head coach Joe Dollins, the Rangers compiled a 3–4 record (1–4 against OCC opponents), finished in last place in the OCC, and were outscored by a total of 91 to 74.

Walter D. Newby was the athletic director, and C.L "Dick" Highfill was the assistant coach.

All-conference team
The Associated Press (AP), based on votes of the OCC coaches, selected four Southeastern and four Central players as first-team picks on its 1946 all-conference team. The first-team choices were:

 Quarterback: Howard Guyer, Southeastern
 Backs: Bill Thompson, Southwestern; Johnny Dunaway, Central; Durard Givens, Central
 Ends: Gene Jones, Southeastern; Bennie Carlisle, Northeastern
 Tackles: Kenneth Brady, Central; Albert Stover, Southwestern
 Guards: Oscar Ragland, Central; James Harris, Southeastern
 Center: Lloyd "Red" Skelton, Southeastern

References